Thomas Brooke (4 June 1684 – 17 August 1757) was an English Anglican priest, most notably Dean of Chester  from 1732 until his death.

Brooke was born in Brereton, Cheshire and educated at St Catharine's College, Cambridge. He held livings at Winslow, Nantwich and Dodleston.

Notes

1684 births
1757 deaths
18th-century English Anglican priests
Deans of Chester
Alumni of St Catharine's College, Cambridge
People from Cheshire